Paps'n'Skar is an Italian dance music group.

The group was formed in 1994 by former schoolmates Emanuele Cozzi ("Paps") and Davide Scarpulla ("Skar"). Their first single, "Because I'm Free", was released in 1998. Following this they released several further singles; the 2005 single "Vieni con me" hit #2 in Italy. A lone full-length, UNO, was issued in 2003.

Singles

References

Italian musical groups